This is a list of U.S. statewide elected executive officials. These state constitutional officers have their duties and qualifications mandated in state constitutions. This list does not include those elected to serve in non-executive branches of government, such as justices of the state supreme courts or at-large members of the state legislatures. This list also excludes federal legislators, such as the two members of the United States Senate elected from each state or at-large members of the United States House of Representatives. Equivalent officeholders from territories and the federal district are also included.

Number of statewide elections by state

The following chart indicates the number of statewide elections in each state. Note that a single election may be used to elect multiple statewide officials.

Number of offices by type 

Governor (55/56)
Lieutenant governor (47/56)
In 26 states and four territories, the lieutenant governor is elected on a ticket with the governor, eight of them using separate primaries. They are marked with an asterisk.
Secretary of state (35/56)
Attorney general (46/56)
Treasurer (36/56)
Auditor (34/56)
Superintendent of public instruction (13/56)
Agriculture commissioner (12/56)
Insurance commissioner (10/56)
 Land commissioner (5/56)
Labor commissioner (4/56)
Mine inspector (1/56)
Tax commissioner (1/56)

Alabama

Alaska

Arizona

Arkansas

California

Colorado

Connecticut

Delaware

Florida

Georgia

Hawaii

Idaho

Illinois

Indiana

Iowa

Kansas

Kentucky

Louisiana

Maine

Maryland

Massachusetts

Michigan

Minnesota

Mississippi

Missouri

Montana

Nebraska

Nevada

New Hampshire

New Jersey

New Mexico

New York

North Carolina

North Dakota

Ohio

Oklahoma

Oregon

Pennsylvania

Rhode Island

South Carolina

South Dakota

Tennessee

Texas

Utah

Vermont

Virginia

Washington

West Virginia

Wisconsin

Wyoming

American Samoa

District of Columbia

Guam

Northern Mariana Islands

Puerto Rico

United States Virgin Islands

Notes

See also
List of United States governors
List of United States lieutenant governors
List of state parties of the Democratic Party (United States)
List of state parties of the Republican Party (United States)

State government in the United States
State constitutional officers of the United States